Buduaar (from ) is an Estonian women's magazine. It was founded in Tallinn in 2003. Its content generally includes articles discussing fashion, beauty, family, sex, health, alternative medicine, and esotericism. The magazine is published 6 times a year. The chief executive officer is Marge Tava.

References

External links 
  
 

Magazines established in 2003
Quarterly magazines
Women's magazines
Bilingual magazines
Estonian-language magazines
Russian-language magazines
Women's fashion magazines
2003 establishments in Estonia
History of women in Estonia